WVGN-LD, virtual and UHF digital channel 19, is a low-powered NBC-affiliated television station serving the United States Virgin Islands that is licensed to Charlotte Amalie, Saint Thomas. Owned by Caribbean Broadcasting Network, it is a sister station to dual This TV/Fox affiliate WVXF (channel 17). WVGN-LD's transmitter is located on Signal Hill.

WVGN is available on Viya Cable channel 11, and as part of the Virgin Islands locals package on Dish Network. The station was also available in Puerto Rico on Dish until December 31, 2013 when it was replaced by a new NBC station on WKAQ-TV's third digital subchannel.

The station simulcasts the 6 a.m., 5 p.m., 6 p.m., and 11 p.m. ET editions of WNBC's News 4 New York broadcasts. Notably, WNBC was the default NBC affiliate for the Virgin Islands until WVGN signed on. WVGN does not provide any local newscasts for the U.S. Virgin Islands.

Digital channel

References

External links
http://www.caribbeanbroadcasting.com/nbcvi/ - Official Website

NBC network affiliates
VGN-LD
Television channels and stations established in 2004
2004 establishments in the United States Virgin Islands
Low-power television stations in the United States
Charlotte Amalie, U.S. Virgin Islands